The 43rd South American U20 Championships in Athletics were held at Estadio Pedro Grajales in Cali, Colombia, between 14 and 16 June.

Medal summary

Men

Women

Medal table

References

South American U20 Championships in Athletics
South American U20 Championships in Athletics
South American U20 Championships in Athletics
South American U20 Championships in Athletics
South American U20 Championships in Athletics